William Guy Banister (March 7, 1901 – June 6, 1964) was an employee of the Federal Bureau of Investigation, an Assistant Superintendent of the New Orleans Police Department, and a private investigator. After his death, New Orleans District Attorney Jim Garrison alleged that he had been involved in the assassination of John F. Kennedy.

He was an avid anti-communist, alleged member of the Minutemen, the John Birch Society, Louisiana Committee on Un-American Activities, and alleged publisher of the Louisiana Intelligence Digest.  He also supported anti-Castro groups in the New Orleans area: "Cuban Democratic Revolutionary Front"; "Anti-Communist League of the Caribbean"; "Friends of Democratic Cuba". According to the New Orleans States-Item newspaper, Banister "participated in every anti-Communist South and Central American revolution that came along, acting as a key liaison man for the U.S. government-sponsored anti-Communist activities in Latin America."

Early life 

Banister was born in Monroe, Louisiana, the oldest of seven children.  After studying at the Louisiana State University, he joined the Monroe Police Department.

Law enforcement career 

In 1934, Banister joined the Federal Bureau of Investigation.  He was present at the killing of John Dillinger. Originally based in Indianapolis, he later moved to New York City where he was involved in the investigation of the American Communist Party. FBI Director J. Edgar Hoover was impressed by Banister's work and, in 1938, he was promoted to run the FBI unit in Butte, Montana.  In December 1944, Banister was charged with investigating a fatal Fu-Go balloon bomb near Kalispell, Montana.  During the 1947 flying disc craze, Banister investigated a hoaxed saucer in Twin Falls.

He also served in Oklahoma City, Minneapolis and Chicago.  In Chicago, he was the Special Agent in Charge for the FBI.  He retired from the FBI in 1954.

Banister moved to Louisiana and, in January 1955, became Assistant Superintendent of the New Orleans Police Department, where he was given the task of investigating organized crime and corruption within the police force. It later emerged that he was also involved in looking at the role that left-wing political activists were playing in the struggle for civil rights in New Orleans. On the campuses of Tulane University and Louisiana State University, he ran a network of informants collecting information on "communist" activities.  He submitted reports on his findings to the FBI through contacts.

In March 1957, NOPD Superintendent Provosty Dayries suspended Banister after witnesses reported he had drawn his revolver while threatening a bartender at the Old Absinthe House on Bourbon Street in the French Quarter. Banister denied the allegations, and the bartender described the incident as an "unprovoked attack". Banister's suspension ended in June of that year, however, Dayries dismissed Banister from the force for "open defiance" after he refused to be reassigned as the department's chief of planning. In supporting Dayries' decision, New Orleans' mayor Chep Morrison said that there was "no other course that one could sensibly follow".

Private investigation, Cuba, Oswald, Marcello 

After leaving the New Orleans Police Department, Banister established his own private detective agency, Guy Banister Associates, Inc. at 434 Balter Building. In June 1960, Banister moved his office to 531 Lafayette Street on the ground floor of the Newman Building. Around the corner but located in the same building, with a different entrance, was the address 544 Camp Street, which would later be found stamped on Fair Play for Cuba Committee leaflets distributed by Lee Harvey Oswald, the suspected assassin of President John F. Kennedy. The Newman Building housed militant anti-Castro groups, including the Cuban Revolutionary Council (October 1961 to February 1962), as well as Sergio Arcacha Smith's Crusade to Free Cuba Committee.

Banister was implicated in a 1961 raid on a munitions depot in Houma, Louisiana, in which "various weapons, grenades and ammunition were stolen ... which were reportedly seen stacked in Banister's back room by several witnesses." The New Orleans States-Item newspaper reported an allegation that Banister served as a munitions supplier for the 1961 Bay of Pigs Invasion and continued to deal weapons from his office until 1963.

In 1962, Banister allegedly dispatched an associate, Maurice Brooks Gatlin — legal counsel of Banister's "Anti-Communist League of the Caribbean" — to Paris to deliver a suitcase containing $200,000 for the French OAS. In 1963, Banister and anti-Castro activist David Ferrie began working for a lawyer named G. Wray Gill and his client, New Orleans Mafia boss Carlos Marcello.  This involved attempts to block Marcello's deportation to Guatemala.

In early 1962, Banister assisted David Ferrie in a dispute with Eastern Airlines regarding charges brought against Ferrie by the airline and New Orleans police of "crimes against nature and extortion." During this period, Ferrie was frequently seen at Banister's office. Banister served as a character witness for Ferrie at his airline pilot's grievance board hearing in the summer of 1963.

JFK assassination and trial of Clay Shaw 

On the afternoon of November 22, 1963, the day that President John F. Kennedy was assassinated, Banister and one of his investigators, Jack Martin, were drinking together at the Katzenjammer Bar, located next door to 544 Camp Street in New Orleans. On their return to Banister's office, the two men got into a dispute. Banister believed that Martin had stolen some files and drew his .357 Magnum revolver, striking Martin with it several times. Martin was badly injured and treated at Charity Hospital. When questioned about the incident in December 1977 by investigators for the United States House Select Committee on Assassinations (HSCA), Martin said that in the heat of the argument just prior to the pistol-whipping he had said to Banister: "What are you going to do — kill me like you all did Kennedy?" 

Over the next few days, Martin told authorities and reporters that anti-Castro activist David Ferrie had been involved in the assassination. He claimed that Ferrie knew Oswald from their days in the New Orleans Civil Air Patrol, and that Ferrie might have taught Oswald how to use a rifle with a telescopic sight. Martin also claimed that Ferrie drove to Texas on the day of Kennedy's assassination, to serve as a getaway pilot for the assassins.

Witnesses interviewed by the HSCA indicate Banister was "aware of Oswald and his Fair Play for Cuba Committee before the assassination."

Banister's secretary, Delphine Roberts, told author Anthony Summers that Oswald "seemed to be on familiar terms with Banister and with [Banister's] office." Roberts said, "As I understood it, he had the use of an office on the second floor, above the main office where we worked. Then, several times, Mr. Banister brought me upstairs, and in the office above I saw various writings stuck up on the wall pertaining to Cuba. There were various leaflets up there pertaining to Fair Play for Cuba.'" The House Select Committee on Assassinations investigated Roberts' claims and said that "the reliability of her statements could not be determined."

The alleged activities of Banister, Ferrie and Oswald reached New Orleans District Attorney Jim Garrison who, by late 1966, had become interested in the New Orleans aspects of the assassination. In December 1966, Garrison interviewed Martin about these activities. Martin claimed that Banister, Ferrie and a group of anti-Castro Cuban exiles were involved in operations against Castro's Cuba that included gun running and burglarized armories.

As Garrison continued his investigation, he became convinced that a group of right-wing activists, including Banister, Ferrie and Clay Shaw, were involved in a conspiracy with elements of the Central Intelligence Agency (CIA) to kill Kennedy. Garrison would later claim that the motive for the assassination was anger over Kennedy's attempts to obtain a peace settlement in both Cuba and Vietnam. Garrison also believed that Banister, Shaw, and Ferrie had conspired to set up Oswald as a patsy in the JFK assassination.

Post JFK 
Banister's publication, the Louisiana Intelligence Digest, maintained that the civil rights movement was part of an international communist conspiracy and was treasonous.

Personal life
Banister was a Freemason and a Shriner.

Death 

Banister died of coronary thrombosis on June 6, 1964. Banister's files went to various people after his death. Later, New Orleans Assistant District Attorney Andrew Sciambra interviewed Banister's widow. She told him that she saw some Fair Play for Cuba leaflets in Banister's office when she went there after his death.

Fictional portrayals 

Banister is a character in Oliver Stone's 1991 movie JFK, in which he is portrayed by Edward Asner. He is also central to the plot of Don DeLillo's novel Libra.  Guy Banister appears as a character in James Ellroy's 1995 novel American Tabloid and its sequel The Cold Six Thousand. In American Tabloid, Banister organizes John Kennedy's assassination, which is based on Ward Littell's original plan. Littell is one of the story's main characters. In The Cold Six Thousand, Guy Banister is murdered by Chuck Rogers under orders from Carlos Marcello.

References

External links 

Who was Guy Banister? at www.jfk-online.com

1901 births
1964 deaths
People from Monroe, Louisiana
John Birch Society members
People associated with the assassination of John F. Kennedy
Federal Bureau of Investigation agents
Private detectives and investigators
New Orleans Police Department officers
Louisiana Democrats
Deaths from coronary thrombosis